Amalda maritzae is a species of sea snail, a marine gastropod mollusc in the family Ancillariidae, the olives.

Description

Distribution

References

 Bozzetti L. (2007). Malacologia 56. Page 14-16

maritzae
Gastropods described in 2007